Ilkka Antero Viljanen (born 12 December 1960 in Lahti) is a Finnish politician. He was a member of the Parliament of Finland from 2007 to 2011, representing the National Coalition Party.

References

1960 births
Living people
People from Lahti
National Coalition Party politicians
Members of the Parliament of Finland (2007–11)